Osman Faruk Loğoğlu (born 1941) is a Turkish diplomat and the former Turkish ambassador to the United States of America, having served from 2001 to 2005.

Education
Loğoğlu graduated from Tarsus American College and received his undergraduate and master's degree in political science at Brandeis University in Waltham, MA on the Wien International Scholarship, and his Ph.D. from Princeton University in 1970.

Career
Loğoğlu has more than thirty-five years of experience in the Turkish Ministry of Foreign Services (MFS), and has specifically addressed issues relating to Turkey's external affairs, the Middle East and Europe. Loğoğlu is currently the  president of the Eurasian Strategic Studies Center (ASAM), one of the leading think tanks in Turkey, headquartered in Ankara. Additionally, he serves as deputy chairman of the Turkish National Commission for UNESCO, as acting president of the Foundation for Local Volunteers for Disaster Relief, and as a member of the board of the Strategic Studies Center of the Turkish Ministry of Foreign Affairs.

Prior to entering the Turkish Ministry of Foreign Services, Loğoğlu was a lecturer in political science at Middlebury College in Vermont, from 1969 to 1970.

From 1973 to 1976, Loğoğlu held the position of first secretary at the European Union and in Dhaka, Bangladesh from 1976 to 1978.

During the 1980s Ambassador Loğoğlu was the head of the Department of Ministry of Foreign Affairs where his responsibilities centered primarily on bilateral political affairs and Cyprus and Greece issues, serving as a Counselor at the Permanent Mission of Turkey to the United Nations in New York from 1980 to 1984.

From 1986 to 1989, Loğoğlu was the consulate general in Hamburg, Germany. He was appointed the deputy undersecretary in 1998.

Dr. Loğoğlu served as the Turkish ambassador to Baku, Azerbaijan from 1996 to 1998 and to Copenhagen, Denmark from 1993 to 1996.

He was appointed the undersecretary of the Turkish ministry of foreign affairs from 2000 to 2001, before assuming the position of the ambassador to the USA in 2001.

He retired from Turkish Foreign Service in 2006. He headed one of Turkey's major think tanks for two years (2006–2008), the Center for Eurasian Strategic Studies (ASAM) headquartered in Ankara. Loğoğlu also served as the Deputy Chairperson of the Turkish National Commission for UNESCO, 2006–2010 and chaired the Cultural Committee during the General Conference of UNESCO in Paris.  
Loğoğlu worked with the Turkey Change Movement (TDH) in 2010. He then joined the Republican People's Party (CHP) and was elected to the Turkish Parliament as adeputy from the province of Adana in the June 2011 elections. He is now a member of the Foreign Relations Committee of the Turkish Grand National Assembly (TBMM), a member of CHP's Party Council and a Vice-chairperson of CHP in charge of foreign relations and organizations abroad.

Authorship
Loğoğlu is the author of the book Ismet Inonu and the Making of Modern Turkey, a biography about the second president of the Turkish Republic, İsmet İnönü.

Personal
He is married to Mevhibe Loğoğlu.

External links
Biography at the Brussels Forum

Brandeis University alumni
Ambassadors of Turkey to the United States
Ambassadors of Turkey to Azerbaijan
Ambassadors of Turkey to Bangladesh
Ambassadors of Turkey to Denmark
Living people
1941 births
Princeton University alumni
Tarsus American College alumni
Members of the 24th Parliament of Turkey
Deputies of Adana
Republican People's Party (Turkey) politicians